Fesenduz (also Romanized as Fesendūz, Fesandooz, Fesandūz, and Fesondūz; also known as Pīr Sodūz and Sulduz) is a village in, and the capital of, Fesenduz Rural District of Firuzabad District of Chaharborj County, West Azerbaijan province, Iran. At the 2006 National Census, its population was 2,681 in 617 households, when it was in the former Marhemetabad District of Miandoab County. The following census in 2011 counted 2,546 people in 684 households. The latest census in 2016 showed a population of 2,461 people in 726 households. Marhemetabad District was separated from Miandoab County, elevated to the status of Chaharborj County, and divided into two districts in 2020.

References 

Populated places in West Azerbaijan Province